Richard Douglas Heffner (August 5, 1925 – December 17, 2013) was the creator and host of The Open Mind, a public affairs television show first broadcast in 1956. He was a University Professor of Communications and Public Policy at Rutgers University and also taught an honors seminar at New York University.  He was the author of A Documentary History of the United States, a verbatim anthology of important public documents in American history, among them the Declaration of Independence, the Gettysburg Address and Martin Luther King Jr.'s Letter from Birmingham Jail. Heffner collaborated with Nobel Peace Prize winner Elie Wiesel on the publication of Conversations With Elie Wiesel, released by Schocken books in 2001.

Career
A protégé of Edward R. Murrow, Heffner helped establish what is now WNET (Channel 13) in New York City and was its first general manager, from 1961–63. From 1974–94 Heffner was chairman of the Classification and Rating Administration (CARA) of the Motion Picture Association of America (MPAA). 

Heffner earned his BA (1946) and MA (1947) degrees in history from Columbia University. He taught two courses at Rutgers University. "Mass Communications and the American Image" is taught through the School of Communication, Information and Library Studies, while "Communication and Human Values" is an honors undergraduate seminar taught through the School of Arts and Sciences. He also taught the same honors undergraduate course, "Communication and Human Values", at New York University.  For the 50th anniversary of The Open Mind in Jan. 2006, fellow broadcaster Bill Moyers guest-hosted the show and interviewed Heffner.

Death
Heffner died of a cerebral hemorrhage on December 17, 2013, aged 88.

See also
MPAA film rating system

References

External sources
 Rutgers University:  Richard D. Heffner
 Richard Heffner, The Gilded Age (1952)

1925 births
2013 deaths
American television personalities
Male television personalities
American humanities academics
Rutgers University faculty
Columbia College (New York) alumni
Place of birth missing
Place of death missing
Columbia Graduate School of Arts and Sciences alumni